Deonte Brown (born January 15, 1998) is an American football offensive guard for the Carolina Panthers of the National Football League (NFL). He played college football at Alabama.

Early years
Brown attended Austin High School in Decatur, Alabama. He played in the 2016 Under Armour All-American Game. He committed to the University of Alabama to play college football.

College career
Brown played at Alabama from 2016 to 2020. After redshirting his first year in 2016, he spent 2017 as a backup before becoming a starter midway through 2018. Overall he played in 48 games and made 26 starts.

Professional career
Brown was drafted by the Carolina Panthers in the sixth round, 193rd overall, of the 2021 NFL Draft. He signed his four-year rookie contract on May 13, 2021. He was placed on injured reserve on October 16. He was activated on November 30.

On August 30, 2022, Brown was waived by the Panthers and signed to the practice squad the next day. He signed a reserve/future contract on January 9, 2023.

References

External links
Alabama Crimson Tide bio

Living people
Sportspeople from Decatur, Alabama
Players of American football from Alabama
American football offensive guards
Carolina Panthers players
Alabama Crimson Tide football players
1998 births